LGBT movements in the United States comprise an interwoven history of lesbian, gay, bisexual, transgender and allied movements in the United States of America, beginning in the early 20th century and influential in achieving social progress for lesbian, gay, bisexual, transgender and transsexual people.

LGBT movements in general
Lesbian, gay, bisexual, and transgender (LGBT) social movements is a political ideology and social movement that advocate for the full acceptance of LGBT people in society. In these movements, LGBT people and their allies have a long history of campaigning for what is now generally called LGBT rights, sometimes also called gay rights or gay and lesbian rights. Although there is not a primary or an overarching central organization that represents all LGBT people and their interests, numerous LGBT rights organizations are active worldwide.

A commonly stated goal among these movements is social equality for LGBT people. Some have also focused on building LGBT communities or worked towards liberation for the broader society from biphobia, homophobia, and transphobia. LGBT movements organized today are made up of a wide range of political activism and cultural activity, including lobbying, street marches, social groups, media, art, and research. Not only does the LGBT community strive for their rights, they celebrate as well. In multiple cities around the United States, a series of events usually over the course of one weekend, are carried out and known widely as Pride. In addition to expressing LGBT rights, the annual event has a goal to show that the community is proud of who they are, and will continue to push forward in their fight for rights.
Sociologist Mary Bernstein writes: "For the lesbian and gay movement, then, cultural goals include (but are not limited to) challenging dominant constructions of masculinity and femininity, homophobia, and the primacy of the gendered heterosexual nuclear family (heteronormativity). Political goals include changing laws and policies in order to gain new rights, benefits, and protections from harm." Bernstein emphasizes that activists seek both types of goals in both the civil and political spheres.

As with other social movements there is also conflict within and between LGBT movements, especially about strategies for change and debates over exactly who comprises the constituency that these movements represent. There is debate over to what extent lesbians, gays, bisexuals, transgender people, intersex people and others share common interests and a need to work together.  Leaders of the lesbian and gay movement of the 1970s, 80s and 90s often attempted to hide masculine lesbians, feminine gay men, transgender people, and bisexuals from the public eye, creating internal divisions within LGBT communities.

LGBT movements have often adopted a kind of identity politics that sees gay, bisexual and/or transgender people as a fixed class of people; a minority group or groups. Those using this approach aspire to liberal political goals of freedom and equal opportunity, and aim to join the political mainstream on the same level as other groups in society. In arguing that sexual orientation and gender identity are innate and cannot be consciously changed, attempts to change gay, lesbian and bisexual people into heterosexuals ("conversion therapy") are generally opposed by the LGBT community. Such attempts are often based in religious beliefs that perceive gay, lesbian and bisexual activity as immoral.

However, others within LGBT movements have criticized identity politics as limited and flawed.Elements of the queer movement have argued that the categories of gay and lesbian are restrictive, and attempted to deconstruct those categories, which are seen to "reinforce rather than challenge a cultural system that will always mark the nonheterosexual as inferior."

Daughters of Bilitis

The Daughters of Bilitis , also called the DOB or the Daughters, were formed in San Francisco, California in 1955 by four lesbian couples, including Phyllis Lyon and Del Martin. Martin and Lyon also have the distinction of being the first legally married gay couple in the U.S. at the start of the historic San Francisco 2004 same-sex weddings. Their marriage was voided 6 months later by the California Supreme Court. The Daughters of Bilitis (DOB), was the first lesbian civil and political rights organization in the United States. The organization,  formed in San Francisco in 1955, was conceived as a social alternative to lesbian bars, which were subject to raids and police harassment. As the DOB gained members, their focus shifted to providing support to women who were afraid to come out. The DOB followed the model of the homophile movement as developed by the Mattachine Society by encouraging its members to assimilate as much as possible into the prevailing heterosexual culture. The DOB advertised itself as "A Woman's Organization for the purpose of Promoting the Integration of the Homosexual into Society."

When the club realized they weren't allowed to advertise their meetings in the newspaper, Lyon and Martin began to print the group's newsletter, The Ladder, in October 1956. It became the first nationally distributed lesbian publication in the U.S. and was distributed to a closely guarded list of subscribers, due to rational fear of exposing. Barbara Gittings was editor for The Ladder from 1963 to 1968 when she passed her editorship to Barbara Grier, who greatly expanded it until the publication met its end in 1972 due to lack of funding.

By 1959 there were chapters of the DOB in New York City, Los Angeles, Chicago, and Rhode Island along with the original chapter in San Francisco. The group also held conferences every two years from 1960 to 1968. As a national organization, the DOB folded in 1970, although some local chapters still continue. During its fourteen years, DOB became a tool of education for lesbians, gay men, researchers, and mental health professionals.

Mattachine Society

The Mattachine Society, founded in 1950, was one of the earliest homophile/homosexual organizations in the United States, probably second only to Chicago's Society for Human Rights (1924). Harry Hay and a group of Los Angeles male friends formed the group to protect and improve the rights of homosexuals. Because of concerns for secrecy and the founders' leftist ideology, they adopted the cell organization being used by the Communist Party of the United States. In the anti-Communist atmosphere of the 1950s, the Society's growing membership replaced the group's early Communist model with a more traditional ameliorative civil-rights leadership style and agenda. Then, as branches formed in other cities, the Society splintered in regional groups by 1961. Formed in Los Angeles in 1950 as the International Bachelors Fraternal Order for Peace and Social Dignity, by William Dale Jennings, along with his companions, it rapidly began to influence gay surroundings. The Mattachine founders attempted to use their personal experience as gay men to redefine the meaning of gay people and their culture in the United States, along with intervening in social life in general.It later adopted the name The Mattachine Society in reference to the society Mattachine, a French medieval masque group that supposedly traveled broadly using entertainment to point out social injustice. The name symbolized the fact that gays were a masked people, who lived in anonymity and underprivileged.

The society began sponsoring discussion groups in 1951, which provided lesbian and gay men an ability to openly share feelings and experiences, also fear and internal disagreements. For many, this was the first and unique opportunity to do so, and such meetings were often highly emotional affairs. Attendance at the Mattachine Society meetings dramatically increased in short time, and such discussion groups spread throughout the United States, even beginning to sponsor social events, write newsletters and publications, and hold fundraisers. Society's Statement of Missions and Purpose from 1951 stands out today in the history of the gay liberation movement by identifying two important themes. First, it called for a grassroots movement of gay people to challenge anti-gay discrimination, and second, it recognized the importance of building a gay community.

The society was forced to endure heavy pressure and public scrutiny during the anti-communist McCarthyism period, due to the communist leanings of some of the Society's members. In a column of the Los Angeles newspaper in March 1953 in regards to the Society, it was called a "strange new pressure group" of "sexual deviants" and "security risks" who were banding together to wield "tremendous political power."

This article generated a dramatic change that in the end, a strong coalition of conservative delegates challenged the societies goals, achievements and instruments. Leadership was demotivated to pursue further activities, the original founders resigned in 1953, and the organization was turned over to the conservative elements who brought in new elements of advocacy and group composition. Some modifications had to be done and advocating took the approach of accommodation rather than mobilizing gay people. They sought the support of the psychiatric profession who they believed held the key to reform. This, however, had a devastating effect as discussion group attendance declined and many local chapters folded. The national structure was dissolved in 1961, with few chapters lasting a few more years.

Organisation's name was unique and not associated or affiliated with other movements that adopted this original symbolic name. Some of those unrelated groups are: Chicago's Mattachine Midwest, Gay Liberation Front, and Gay Activists Alliance, some of them arisen after the Stonewall Rebellion in 1969.

Social and academic atmosphere for rising gay movements

Success of the early informal homosexual student groups, along with the inspiration provided by other college-based movements and the Stonewall riots, led to the proliferation of Gay Liberation Fronts on campuses across the country by the early 1970s. These initial LGBT student movements handed out gay rights literature, organized social events, and sponsored lectures about the gay experience. Through their efforts, the campus climate for LGBT people improved. Also, by gaining institutional recognition and establishing a place on campus for GLBTQ students, the groundwork was laid for the creation of LGBT groups at colleges and universities throughout the country and generation of wider acceptance and tolerance.

At many colleges and universities, these organizations were male-dominated, prompting lesbians to demand greater inclusion and often to form their own groups. During the 1980s, high school and junior high school students began to organize Gay-Straight Alliances, enabling even younger LGBT people to find support and better advocate for their needs.

The Student Homophile League was the first student gay rights organization in the United States, established at Columbia University in 1967 by Stephen Donaldson, who was a former member of the Mattachine Society. Student Homophile League branches were chartered at Cornell University and New York University in 1968 and at the Massachusetts Institute of Technology in 1969. This led to the formation of two non-affiliated groups, the Homosexuals Intransigent at the City University of New York and FREE (Fight Repression of Erotic Expression) at the University of Minnesota in 1969, now the Queer Student Cultural Center. On the West Coast, a Student Homophile League also was founded at Stanford University, likewise with encouragement from Donaldson, who had announced his hopes for the formation of a Stanford chapter in May 1967 in The New York Times. The Student Homophile League of Stanford University, led by Wendell Anderson (pseudonym), was registered with the Office of the Dean of Students as a recognized voluntary student organization through spring quarter 1968. The organization ceased to exist the following academic year.

Arizona 
The University of Arizona's LGBT student group, "Pride Alliance," has been active since the 1990s in providing visibility to LGBT students and faculty at the University. Some of the students' activism also works to provide a safe and welcoming environment for LGBT students. This goal stems from studies showing that LGBT college students have higher levels of depression, bullying, and suicide. Campus-wide activism at the University of Arizona and other colleges has focused on dealing with these issues regarding respect for the LGBT community.

Florida 
A renewed interest in LGBT rights brought about the formation of the Florida Collegiate Pride Coalition in 2003. This forum of LGBT college and university students in Florida is known to work with Equality Florida.

Pennsylvania 
In the Commonwealth of Pennsylvania, The Pennsylvania Student Equality Coalition was founded as an independent and youth-led statewide LGBT organization by Pennsylvania students in April 2011. As of 2012, PSEC is connected with over 70 student LGBT organizations across Pennsylvania. The coalition is focused on campus-community organizing for LGBT equality in Pennsylvania and resource development for educational institutions.

Gay liberation fronts

Although the pre-Stonewall student Homophile Leagues were most heavily influenced by the Mattachine Society, the Post Stonewall student organizations were more likely to be inspired and named after the more militant Gay Liberation Front or (GLF). It was formed in New York City in summer of 1969, and in Los Angeles by activist Morris Kight the same year.

GLF-like campus groups held sponsored social activities, educational programs, and provided support to individual members much like the earlier college groups. However, activists in the GLF-type groups generally were much more visible and more politically oriented than the pre-stonewall gay student groups. These new activists were often committed to radical social change, and preferred confrontational tactics such as demonstrations, sit-ins, and direct challenges to discriminatory campus policies. This new defiant philosophy and approach was influenced by other militant campus movements such as Black Power, anti-Vietnam war groups, and student free speech movements. Many GLF members were involved with other militant groups such as these, and saw gay rights as part of a larger movement to transform society; their own liberation was fundamentally tied to the liberation of all peoples.

Lesbian feminist groups
Despite the fact that most of these early groups stated themselves to support women's liberation, many of the gay student groups were dominated by men. In fact, activities were more aimed at the needs of gay men, even to the point of exclusion to the needs of lesbians and bisexual women. This extended to frequently directing attention to campus harassment of gay men while ignoring the concerns and needs of gay women. Gay women were frequently turned off by the focus on male cruising at many of these events, and as a result, lesbians and bisexual women on some campuses began to hold their own dances and social activities.

As gay began to increasingly refer only to gay men in the 1970s, many lesbians sought to have the names of gay student organizations changed to include them explicitly, or formed their own groups. They saw a need to organize around their oppression as women as well as lesbians, since they knew they could never have an equal voice in groups where men held the political power.

LPAC is a Super PAC founded in 2012 to represent the interests of lesbians in the United States, and to campaign on LGBT and women's rights issues. Its supporters include Billie Jean King, Jane Lynch, Laura Ricketts and Urvashi Vaid. On its first day of operations, LPAC raised $200,000.

Gay Liberation Front

The Activist GLF advocated for sexual liberation for all people; they believed heterosexuality was a remnant of cultural inhibition and felt that change would not come about unless the current social institutions were dismantled and rebuilt without defined sexual roles. To do this, the GLF was intent on transforming the idea of the biological family and clan and making it more akin to a loose affiliation of members without biological subtexts. Prominent members of the GLF also opposed and addressed other social inequalities between the years of 1969 to 1972 such as militarism, racism, and sexism, but because of internal rivalries the GLF officially ended its operations in 1972.

Police raid on the Stonewall Inn, a gay bar in Greenwich Village in New York City in June 1969, generated an unprecedented riot among the patrons. This event served as a catalyst for the emergence of a new breed of gay militant activists quite unlike the more conventional organizations of the past two decades, and became known as gay liberation. Within weeks of the Stonewall event, gay and lesbian activists organized the Gay Liberation Front.

GLF was shaped in part by the Students for a Democratic Society, a radical student organization of the times. Allen Young, a former SDS activist, was key in framing GLF's principles. He asserted that "the artificial categories of 'heterosexual' and 'homosexual' have been laid on us by a sexist society, as gays, we demand an end to the gender programming which starts when we are born, the family, is the primary means by which this restricted sexuality is created and enforced, Our understanding of sexism is premised on the idea that in a few society everyone will be gay." The GLF's statement of purpose clearly stated: "We are a revolutionary group of men and women formed with the realization that complete sexual liberation for all people cannot come about unless existing social institutions are abolished. We reject society's attempt to impose sexual roles and definitions of our nature." GLF groups rapidly spread throughout the United States and other countries.

Members did not limit activism to gay causes. In late 1960s and early 1970s, many homosexuals joined protests with other radical groups such as the Black Panthers, women's liberationists and anti-war activists. Lesbians brought the principles of radical feminism on the emerging new philosophy, and GLF activists argued that the institution of heterosexual families necessitated the oppression of homosexuals, allowing them to define their gayness as a form of political resistance. GLF activist Martha Shelley wrote, "We are women and men who, from the time of our earliest memories, have been in revolt against the sex role structure and nuclear family structure." Though the GLF effectively ceased to exist in 1972, unable to successfully negotiate the differences among its members, its activists remained committed to working on political issues and the issue of homosexuality itself.

GLF's legacy informed gay and lesbian activism throughout the late 1980s and early 1990s when groups such as ACT UP and Queer Nation formed to fight AIDS and homophobia. Many of the leaders of these two groups had been either active in or heavily influenced by the ideas first promoted by GLF.

Even though many activists became disenchanted with the organization, their determination to carry forth the spirit of gay liberation through new groups such as the Gay Activists Alliance and the Radicalesbians proved invaluable in the continuing fight for GLBTQ rights.

Significance of ONE, Incorporated

ONE, Inc. had a tremendous impact on vision and mission of socially active gay people in early phases of movement. It was started by William Dale Jennings joined with likeminded colleagues Don Slater, Dorr Legg, Tony Reyes, and Mattachine Society founder Harry Hay. It formed the public part of the early homophile movement, with a public office, administrative infrastructure, logistics, a telephone, and the first publication that reached the general public, ONE Magazine, a huge leap of gay movement. The Los Angeles Postmaster seized and refused to mail copies of ONE Magazine in 1954 on grounds that it was "obscene, lewd, lascivious and filthy." This action led to prolonged court battles which had significant influence on gay and lesbian movements. In 1958, the Supreme Court of the United States ruled unanimously in One, Inc. v. Olesen that the mere discussion of homosexuality was not obscene, and the magazine continued to be published and distributed until 1972.

Along with its continuing growth a part of ONE became the Homosexual Information Center, formed by Don Slater, Billy Glover, Joe and Jane Hansen, Tony Reyes, Jim Schneider, et al. Part of ONE's archives are at the University of Southern California and part are at California State University, Northridge. The funding part of ONE still exists as the Institute for the Study of Human Resources, which controls the name ONE, Inc.

Websites for parts of ONE and HIC are:

HIC
One Archives

Affirmation: Gay & Lesbian Mormons

This is an international organization for gay, lesbian, transgender, bisexual, and intersex people who identify as members or ex-members of the Church of Jesus Christ of Latter-day Saints (LDS Church). Although a core belief is that "homosexuality and homosexual relationships can be consistent with and supported by the Gospel of Jesus Christ," it is not in fact supported by the doctrine in this religion.

Under the name Affirmation: Gay Mormons United, the first Affirmation group was organized in Salt Lake City, Utah on June 11, 1977 by Stephan Zakharias and a group of other Mormon and ex-Mormons Gays and Lesbians. The original group struggled to survive until 1978, when Paul Mortensen formed the Los Angeles chapter and in 1980 the name was changed to Affirmation:Gay & Lesbian Mormons. Through the influence of the Los Angeles chapter, Affirmation groups appeared in many cities around the country.

In 1985, some members of Affirmation formed a Latter Day Saint church for gays and lesbians known as the Restoration Church of Jesus Christ.

Gay & Lesbian Advocates & Defenders (GLAD) 

GLAD is a non-profit legal rights organization in the United States. The organization works to end discrimination based on sexual orientation, HIV status, and gender identity and expression.

John Ward founded GLAD in 1978 and filed its first case, Doe v. McNiff, that same year. An early victory came in Fricke v. Lynch (1980), in which GLAD represented Aaron Fricke, an 18-year-old student at Cumberland High School in Rhode Island, who won the right to bring a same-sex date to a high school dance. GLAD is based in Boston, Massachusetts, and serves the New England area of the United States. Services it provides include litigation, advocacy, and educational work in all areas of LGBT (lesbian, gay,  bisexual, transgender) civil rights and the rights of people living with HIV. The organization also operates a telephone hotline and website.

In 2003, GLAD received national attention for its work in winning marriage rights for same-sex couples in Massachusetts. In Goodridge v. Department of Public Health, it successfully argued before the Massachusetts Supreme Judicial Court that to restrict marriage to heterosexual couples was a violation of the state constitution. In October 2008, GLAD won marriage rights for same-sex couples in Connecticut with a decision of the Supreme Court of Connecticut in Kerrigan v. Commissioner of Public Health.

GLAAD 

GLAAD (formerly the Gay & Lesbian Alliance Against Defamation) is a U.S. non-governmental media monitoring organization which promotes the image of LGBT people in the media. Before March 2013, the name "GLAAD" had been an acronym for "Gay & Lesbian Alliance Against Defamation," but became the primary name due to its inclusiveness of bisexual and transgender issues. Its stated mission, in part, is to "[amplify] the voice of the LGBT community by empowering real people to share their stories, holding the media accountable for the words and images they present, and helping grassroots organizations communicate effectively."

Formed in New York City in 1985 to protest against what it saw as the New York Posts defamatory and sensationalized AIDS coverage, GLAAD put pressure on media organizations to end what it saw as homophobic reporting.  Initial meetings were held in the homes of several New York City activists as well as after-hours at the New York State Council on the Arts.  The founding group included film scholar Vito Russo; Gregory Kolovakos, then on the staff of the NYS Arts Council and who later became the first executive director; Darryl Yates Rist; Allen Barnett; and Jewelle Gomez, the organization's first treasurer. Some members of GLAAD went on to become the early members of ACT UP.

In 1987, after a meeting with GLAAD, The New York Times changed its editorial policy to use the word gay instead of harsher terms referring to homosexuality. GLAAD advocated that the Associated Press and other television and print news sources follow. GLAAD's influence soon spread to Los Angeles, where organizers began working with the entertainment industry to change the way LGBT people were portrayed on screen.

Entertainment Weekly has named GLAAD as one of Hollywood's most powerful entities, and the Los Angeles Times described GLAAD as "possibly one of the most successful organizations lobbying the media for inclusion."

Within the first five years of its founding in New York as the Gay and Lesbian Anti-Defamation League (soon after changed to "Gay & Lesbian Alliance Against Defamation" after legal pressure by the Anti-Defamation League), GLAAD chapters had been established in Los Angeles and other cities, with the LA chapter becoming particularly influential due to its proximity to the California entertainment industry. GLAAD/NY and GLAAD/LA would eventually vote to merge in 1994, with other city chapters joining soon afterward; however, the chapters continue to exist, with the ceremonies of the GLAAD Media Awards being divided each year into three ceremonies held in New York City, Los Angeles and San Francisco.

New generation activism embodied in Queer Nation

On March 20, 1990, sixty LGBTQ people gathered at the Lesbian, Gay, Bisexual and Transgender Community Services Center in New York's Greenwich Village to create a direct action organization. The goal of the unnamed organization was the elimination of homophobia, and the increase of gay, lesbian and bisexual visibility through a variety of tactics. The group's breakthrough was at New York's Gay Pride parade when militant AIDS activists passed out to the assembled crowd an inflammatory manifesto, bearing the titles "I Hate Straights!" and "Queers Read This!" Within days, in response to the brash, "in-your-face" tone of the broadside, Queer Nation chapters had sprung up in San Francisco and other major cities. The name Queer Nation had been used casually since the group's inception, until it was officially approved at the group's general meeting on May 17, 1990.

Rather than denote a particular genre of sexual identity, "queer" came to represent any number of positions arrayed in opposition to oppressive social and cultural norms and policies related to sexuality and gender. Their political philosophy was succinctly summed up in the now-clichéd slogan, "We're Here. We're Queer. Get Used to It." Queer Nation relied on large and public meetings to set the agendas and plan the actions of its numerous committees (such as LABIA: Lesbians and Bisexuals in Action, and SHOP: Suburban Homosexual Outreach Project). Just as importantly, "queer" became an important concept both socially and intellectually, helping to broaden what had been primarily a gay and lesbian social movement into one that was more inclusive of bisexual and transgender people.  Queer Nation's style drew on the urgency felt in the AIDS activist community about the mounting epidemic and the paucity of meaningful governmental response, and was inspired largely by the attention-grabbing direct-action tactics of the AIDS Coalition to Unleash Power (ACT UP). Described by activist scholars Allan Bérubé and Jeffrey Escoffier as the first "retro-future/postmodern" activist group to address gay, lesbian, bisexual, and transgender concerns, the short-lived organization made a lasting impact on sexual identity politics in the United States. The lived political necessity of understanding the nexus of gender and sexuality in this broadening social movement, in turn, helped launch the field of "queer studies" in higher education.

History of the LGBTQ+ movement in the United States

In the United States, what little information scholars have been able to recover about the political sensibilities of transgender people in the early 20th century indicates an acute awareness of their vulnerability to arrest, discrimination against them in housing and employment opportunities, and their difficulties in creating "bureaucratically coherent" legal identities due to a change of gender status. They generally experienced a sense of social isolation, and often expressed a desire to create a wider network of associations with other transgender people. In fact, there are quite a few arguments as to when the true beginning of the American Gay Rights Movement starts. The earliest date being claimed is that of 1924 in Chicago when the Society for Human Rights was founded to declare civil rights for gays. However, it is also argued that the beginning of the Gay Rights Movement, LGBT Movement in the United States, after years of being highly controlled and hidden, successfully began in the 1940s in Los Angeles. One of the initial or founding organizations was the Mattachine Society. A secretive society which later began to be associated with Communist values, the society became involved in politics and made its first appearance by supporting Henry Wall and the Progressive Party during the presidential election of 1948. The Mattachine Society was led by Harry Hay and began to slowly gain national attention and membership. Some historians also mark the beginning of the movement as a 1965 gay march held in front of Independence Hall in Philadelphia to protest the dismissal of homosexual federal employees. An even later occurrence that is also said to have been the beginning of the movement for Gay Rights was the Stonewall Riots, Stonewall Inn of 1969. On June 27, 1969 New York's Stonewall Inn bar was raided by police. Though this was a regular incident in gay bars like Stonewall, the reaction of its patrons, as they refused to leave and clashed with the raiding police officers, ultimately led to street riots. This event gave way to mass media attention on the issues facing the LGBT community and therefore increased public awareness, making it possible to have an influential movement. Some offer a less specific time for the beginning of the movement and argue that it was during the wake of World War II that the movement to protect gay and lesbian civil rights emerged. Men and women who participated in the military's homosexual world began to realize that it was a part of their identity. As they moved back to the cities they began to live their new lifestyle openly and in great numbers only to be severely oppressed by the police and the government. Scholars do not pinpoint a mutual and clearly defined beginning of gay rights activism in the U.S and as said before this may be to their unfortunate political and social positions. Though there is much confusion as to the beginning of the movement, there are clearly defined phases throughout the movement for gay rights in the U.S.  The first phase of the movement being the homophile phase, which mainly consisted of the activities of the Mattachine Society, the ONE, Inc. publication, and The Daughters of Bilitis.  The homophile movement, which stresses love as opposed to sexuality, focused on protesting political systems for social acceptability. Any demonstrations held by homophile organizations were orderly and polite, but these demonstrations had little impact for they were ignored by the media.<ref name="United States 2008">'Gay Rights Movement in the United States. Dudley Clendinen.2008. Microsoft Encarta Online Encyclopedia.3 March 2009</ref> In 1969 the second phase of the movement, gay liberation, began. During this phase, the number of homophile organizations increased rapidly, as many of the LGBT community became inspired by the various cultural movements occurring during the time period, such as the anti- Vietnam War movement or the Black Power movement. Activism during this phase encouraged "gay power" and encouraged homosexuals to "come out of the closet," so as to publicly display their pride in who they are.  They were also more forceful about resisting anti-homosexuality sanctions than activists from the previous phase, participating in marches, riots, and sit-ins. These radicals of the 1970s would later call the previous homophile groups assimilationist for their less vigorous methods. Also during this phase there was an increase in lesbian centered organizations within the movement.

Opposition
Inconvenient public opinions

LGBT movements are opposed by a variety of individuals and organizations."Roman Catholics and Homosexuality" , Ontario Consultants on Religious Tolerance (2006)Shafran, Rabbi Avi. "Jewish Law: Marital Problems". Jewish Law Commentary: Examining Halacha, Jewish Issues, and Secular Law. They may have a personal, moral, political or religious objection to gay rights, homosexual relations or gay people.  Opponents say same-sex relationships are not marriages, that legalization of same-sex marriage will open the door for the legalization of polygamy,  that it is unnatural and that it encourages unhealthy behavior.  Some social conservatives believe that all sexual relationships with people other than an opposite-sex spouse undermines the traditional family and that children should be reared in homes with both a father and a mother."The Family: A Proclamation to the World", churchofjesuschrist.org Since society has become more accepting of homosexuality, there has been the emergence of many groups that desire to end homosexuality; during the 1990s, one of the best known groups that was established with this goal is the ex-gay movement.

Some people worry that gay rights may conflict with individuals' freedom of speech, religious freedoms in the workplace, and the ability to run churches, charitable organizations and other religious organizations that hold opposing social and cultural views to LGBT rights. There is also concern that religious organizations might be forced to accept and perform same-sex marriages or risk losing their tax-exempt status.

Eric Rofes author of the book, A Radical Rethinking of Sexuality and Schooling: Status Quo or Status Queer?, argues that the inclusion of teachings on homosexuality in public schools will play an important role in transforming public ideas about lesbian and gay individuals.  As a former teacher in the public school system, Rofes recounts how he was fired from his teaching position after making the decision to come out as gay. As a result of the stigma that he faced as a gay teacher he emphasizes the necessity of the public to take radical approaches to making significant changes in public attitudes about homosexuality. According to Rofes, radical approaches are grounded in the belief that "something fundamental needs to be transformed for authentic and sweeping changes to occur."The radical approaches proposed by Rofes have been met with strong opposition from anti-gay rights activists such as John Briggs. Former California senator, John Briggs proposed Proposition 6, a ballot initiative that would require that all California state public schools fire any gay or lesbian teachers or counselors, along with any faculty that displayed support for gay rights in an effort to prevent what he believe to be " the corruption of the children's minds". The exclusion of homosexuality from the sexual education curriculum, in addition to the absence of sexual counseling programs in public schools, has resulted in increased feelings of isolation and alienation for gay and lesbian students who desire to have gay counseling programs that will help them come to terms with their sexual orientation. Eric Rofes founder of youth homosexual programs, such as Out There and Committee for Gay Youth, stresses the importance of having support programs that help youth learn to identify with their sexual orientation.

David Campos, author of the book, Sex, Youth, and Sex Education: A Reference Handbook, illuminates the argument proposed by proponents of sexual education programs in public schools. Many gay rights supporters argue that teachings about the diverse sexual orientations that exist outside of heterosexuality are pertinent to creating students that are well informed about the world around them. However, Campos also acknowledges that the sex education curriculum alone cannot teach youth about factors associated with sexual orientation but instead he suggests that schools implement policies that create safe school learning environments and foster support for gay and lesbian, bisexual, and transgender youth. It is his belief that schools that provide unbiased, factual information about sexual orientation, along with supportive counseling programs for these homosexual youth will transform the way society treats homosexuality.
Many opponents of LGBT social movements have attributed their indifference toward homosexuality as being a result of the immoral values that it may instill in children who are exposed to homosexual individuals. In opposition to this claim, many proponents of increased education about homosexuality suggest that educators should refrain from teaching about sexuality in schools entirely. In her book entitled "Gay and Lesbian Movement," Margaret Cruickshank provides statistical data from the Harris and Yankelvoich polls which confirmed that over 80% of American adults believe that students should be educated about sexuality within their public school. In addition, the poll also found that 75% of parents believe that homosexuality and abortion should be included in the curriculum as well. An assessment conducted on California public school systems discovered that only 2% of all parents actually disproved of their child being taught about sexuality in school.

It had been suggested that education has a positive impact on support for same sex marriage. African Americans statistically have lower rates of educational achievement, however, the education level of African Americans does not have as much significance on their attitude towards same-sex marriage as it does on white attitudes. Educational attainment among whites has a significant positive effect on support for same-sex marriage, whereas the direct effect of education among African Americans is less significant. The income levels of whites have a direct and positive correlation with support for same-sex marriage, but African American income level is not significantly associated with attitudes toward same-sex marriage.

Location also affects ideas towards same-sex marriage; residents of rural and southern areas are significantly more opposed to same-sex marriage in comparison to residents elsewhere. Women are consistently more supportive than men of LGBT rights, and individuals that are divorced or have never married are also more likely to grant marital rights to same-sex couples than married or widowed individuals. Also, white women are significantly more supportive than white men, but there are no gender discrepancies among African Americans. The year in which one was born is a strong indicator of attitude towards same-sex marriage—generations born after 1946 are considerably more supportive of same-sex marriage than older generations. Statistics show that African Americans are more opposed to same-sex marriage than any other ethnicity.

Studies show that Non-Protestants are much more likely to support same-sex unions than Protestants; 63% of African Americans claim that they are Baptist or Protestant, whereas only 30% of white Americans are. Religion, as measured by individuals' religious affiliations, behaviors, and beliefs, has a lot of influence in structuring same-sex union attitudes and consistently influences opinions about homosexuality. The most liberal attitudes are generally reflected by Jews, liberal Protestants, and people who are not affiliated with religion. This is because many of their religious traditions have not "systematically condemned homosexual behaviors" in recent years. Moderate and tolerant attitudes are generally reflected by Catholics and moderate Protestants. And lastly, the most conservative views are held by Evangelical Protestants. Moreover, it is a tendency for one to be less tolerant of homosexuality if their social network is strongly tied to a religious congregation. Organized religion, especially Protestant and Baptist affiliations, espouse conservative views which traditionally denounce same-sex unions. Therefore, these congregations are more likely to hear messages of this nature. Polls have also indicated that the amount and level of personal contact that individuals have with homosexual individuals and traditional morality affects attitudes of same-sex marriage and homosexuality.

Opposition throughout history
Though gay and lesbians struggled to go public with their efforts in the U.S, they still were met with opposition. Despite participating in very few public activities in the early 19th century, many gays and lesbians were targeted by police who kept list of the bars and restaurants that were known to cater to the population. Many were arrested for sodomy or hospitalized in mental facilities for homosexuality. They were also fired from many jobs for their lifestyles. States had many laws that made homosexuality a crime and the government would often support the states, as in the 1917 Immigration Act which denied homosexuals entry into the country.

Homosexual organizations were disrupted as they were said to be breaking disorderly conduct laws, and gay bars and business had their licenses illegitimately suspended or revoked. This persecution seemed to only intensify after World War II, because many gays and lesbians were living more openly. Thousands of federal employees including soldiers were discharged and fired for suspicions of being homosexuals. Though since that time, there has been more activism by the LGBT Community, through an increasing number of organizations coupled with more visibility and aggressive protest.  However, many rights are withheld today even after same-sex marriage is approved nationwide in the US on 26 Jun 2016 . Nevertheless, activists of the modern Gay Rights Movement still struggle to seek full equality.

Identity politics

The term identity politics has been applied retroactively to varying movements that long predate its coinage. Historian Arthur Schlesinger Jr. discussed identity politics extensively in his book The Disuniting of America.  Schlesinger, a strong supporter of liberal conceptions of civil rights, argues that a liberal democracy requires a common basis for culture and society to function. The most important and revolutionary element of identity politics is the demand that oppressed groups be recognized not in spite of their differences but specifically because of their differences. The earlier stages of the development of the modern gay movement were closely linked with identity politics. In order for gay and lesbian issues to be placed on the political agenda, gays and lesbians had to identify publicly with their homosexuality and 'come out'. Advocates of identity politics believe in self-determination on the part of oppressed groups. Proponents of identity politics argue that those who do not share the life experiences that it brings to members of an oppressed group cannot understand what it means to be a person with that identity. Not limited to activity in the traditionally conceived political sphere, identity politics refers to activism, politics, theorizing, and other similar activities based on the shared experiences of members of a specific social group (often relying on shared experiences of oppression).

The term identity politics and movements linked to it came into being during the latter part of the 20th century. It can most notably be found in class movements, feminist movements, gay and lesbian movements, disability movements, ethnic movements and post colonial movements. Identity politics is open to wide debate and critique.
Minority influence is a central component of identity politics. Minority influence is a form of social influence which takes place when a majority is being influenced to accept the beliefs or behavior of a minority. Unlike other forms of influence this usually involves a personal shift in private opinion. This personal shift in opinion is called conversion.

Groups who engage in identity politics take part in such activities as community organizing and consciousness-raising, as well as participating in political and social movements. Identity politics assumes that the shared identity and experiences of LGBTQ people is a rational basis for political action, notwithstanding the different (and sometimes competing) interests of individual members of the queer communities. Basic to this assumption is the idea that glbtq people constitute a legitimate political constituency deserving of equal rights and representation. Some critics have argued that groups based on shared identity, other than class (e.g.: religious identity or neurological wiring), can divert energy and attention from more fundamental issues, such as class conflict in capitalist societies. Even those who support gay rights, freedom of religion or ending racism, for instance, may consider these side issues at best. Those with multiple oppressed identities have sometimes responded by forming new, more specific identity politics groups.

Liberal-reformist gay and lesbian activists continue to work for full acceptance of gays and lesbians in the institutions and culture of mainstream society, but queer activists instead make a point of declaring themselves outside of the mainstream and having no desire to be accepted by or join it. Identity politics has sometimes been criticized as narrow, even childish, and essentialist. Social critic bell hooks, for example, argues that identity is too narrow a basis for politics.  However, as long as LGBTQ people are stigmatized and discriminated against on the basis of their sexual and gender identities, identity politics are likely to be seen as an appropriate response.

By the 1980s, the politics of identity had become central to the gay movement's struggles. This opened the path for change but also critique.  Some LGBT rights activists, along with queer theorists, came to criticize the identity politics approach to gay rights, particularly the approach based around the terms and concepts of queer theory. Other queer activists, drawing on the work of Judith Butler, stress the importance of not assuming an already existing identity, but of remaking and unmaking identities through performance. There are also conscientious supporters of identity politics who have developed their stances on the basis of Gayatri Chakravorty Spivak's work, and have described some forms of identity politics as strategic essentialism, a form which has sought to work with hegemonic discourses to reform the understanding of "universal" goals.

In a wider context, some critics counter that the intolerant homogeneity of mainstream culture is precisely the fact that makes full acceptance impossible and that social justice movements should aim toward not integration but rather multicultural pluralism, without recourse to the types of oppressive homogeneity now at play. (See the work of Urvashi Vaid for a discussion of the perils of homogeneity.)

1920s

The 1920s ushered in a new era of social acceptance of minorities and homosexuals, at least in heavily urbanized areas. This was reflected in many of the films (see Pre-Code) of the decade that openly made references to homosexuality. Even popular songs poked fun at the new social acceptance of homosexuality. One of these songs had the title "Masculine Women, Feminine Men." It was released in 1926 and recorded by numerous artists of the day and included the following lyrics:

<poem>
Masculine women, Feminine men
Which is the rooster, which is the hen?
It's hard to tell 'em apart today! And, say!
Sister is busy learning to shave,
Brother just loves his permanent wave,
It's hard to tell 'em apart today! Hey, hey!
Girls were girls and boys were boys when I was a tot,
Now we don't know who is who, or even what's what!
Knickers and trousers, baggy and wide,
Nobody knows who's walking inside,
Those masculine women and feminine men!
</poem>

Homosexuals received a level of acceptance that was not seen again until the 1960s. Until the early 1930s, gay clubs were openly operated, commonly known as "pansy clubs". The relative liberalism of the decade is demonstrated by the fact that the actor William Haines, regularly named in newspapers and magazines as the number-one male box-office draw, openly lived in a gay relationship with his lover, Jimmie Shields. Other popular gay actors/actresses of the decade included Alla Nazimova and Ramon Novarro. In 1927, Mae West wrote a play about homosexuality called The Drag, and alluded to the work of Karl Heinrich Ulrichs. It was a box-office success. West regarded talking about sex as a basic human rights issue, and was also an early advocate of gay rights. Emma Goldman also spoke out in defense of gay rights during this time. With the return of conservatism in the 1930s, the public grew intolerant of homosexuality, and gay actors were forced to choose between retiring or agreeing to hide their sexuality.

Early advocacy
Transgender advocacy efforts did not begin to gain momentum, however, until the 1950s, in the wake of the unprecedented publicity given to Christine Jorgensen, whose 1952 "sex-change" operation made her an international celebrity and brought transgender issues to widespread attention.

Louise Lawrence, a male-to-female transgender person who began living full-time as a woman in San Francisco in the 1940s, was a central figure of transgender community. She worked closely with Alfred Kinsey to bring the needs of transgender people to the attention of social scientists and sex reformers. In 1971, Lawrence released her first science fiction novel, Andra, about a futuristic society in which the ruler dominates the lives of the citizens of an underground city.  The novel, a commentary on fascism, was labeled young adult, despite Lawrence's disagreement with the classification. The novel, which featured some adult content, was toned down and adapted into a short-lived Australian children's show in 1976. Lawrence's eighth novel, Children of the Dust, was published in 1985.  The novel, about the aftermath of a nuclear holocaust, sparked controversy for its nightmarish vision of a future in which children are born with deformities and the government leaves the citizens to fend for themselves. It contains graphic violence, profane language, and descriptions of sexual activity, for which it was banned from many school libraries.  Despite this, the novel has developed a cult following. Lawrence collaborated with Virginia Prince, who began cross-dressing in high school, who founded the first peer support and advocacy groups for male cross-dressers in the United States.

In 1960, the first issue of Prince's magazine Transvestia was published (eight years after her first magazine, which lasted only two editions, but its importance is astounding). Prince acquired the means to fund the publication after assembling a list of 25 acquaintances, each of whom was willing to donate four dollars to her start-up. Working with one hundred dollars, Prince then launched her first issue, published by her own Chevalier Publications, and sold it by subscription and through adult bookstores. Transvestia was published bi-monthly between 1960 and 1980, with a total of 100 issues being created.

Bisexual activism

Bisexuals became more visible in the LGBT rights movement in the 1960s and 1970s. In 1966 bisexual activist Robert A. Martin (aka Donny the Punk) founded the Student Homophile League at Columbia University and New York University. In 1967 Columbia University officially recognized this group, thus making them the first college in the United States to officially recognize a gay student group. Activism on behalf of bisexuals in particular also began to grow, especially in San Francisco. One of the earliest organizations for bisexuals, the Sexual Freedom League in San Francisco, was facilitated by Margo Rila and Frank Esposito beginning in 1967. Two years later, during a staff meeting at a San Francisco mental health facility serving LGBT people, nurse Maggi Rubenstein came out as bisexual. Due to this, bisexuals began to be included in the facility's programs for the first time.

In 1972 a Quaker group, the Committee of Friends on Bisexuality, issued the "Ithaca Statement on Bisexuality" supporting bisexuals.

In that same year the National Bisexual Liberation Group formed in New York.  In 1976 the San Francisco Bisexual Center opened.

Organizational upgrade in 1960s
In the wake of the transgender street prostitutes riot in impoverished Tenderloin neighborhood at a popular all-night restaurant, Gene Compton's Cafeteria. in 1966, San Francisco transsexual activists worked with Harry Benjamin (the nation's leading medical expert on transsexuality), the Erickson Educational Foundation (established by Reed Erickson, who funded the development of a new model of medical service provision for transsexuals in the 1960s and 1970s), activist ministers at the progressive Glide Memorial Methodist Church, and a variety of city bureaucrats to establish a remarkable network of services and support for transsexuals, including city-funded health clinics that provided hormones and federally funded work training programs that helped prostitutes learn job skills to get off the streets and finally give them a significant chance to create a decent and worth-living life, without economic and professional insecurity.

Transgender movement
Transsexuals in San Francisco formed Transsexual Counseling Unit, which was located in office space rented by the War on Poverty. At first, they were organised as C.O.G. (Conversion Our Goal) in 1967.  When funding from the War on Poverty programs ceased,  The Erickson Educational Foundation funded a store front office located in San Francisco's Tenderloin on Turk St. There the Transsexual Counseling Service, with the assistance of the EEF as well as Lee Brewster's Queen Magazine expanded their services beyond the Bay Area by corresponding with transsexuals across the nation. To reflect this the TCS became the "National transsexual Counseling Unit. Reed Erickson was responsible for funding these programs and others which became the early transsexual movement through his foundation the Erickson Educational Foundation. By the later 1960s, some strands of transgender activism were closely linked to gay liberation. Most famously, transgender "street queens" played an instrumental role in sparking the riots at New York's Stonewall Inn in 1969, which are often considered a turning point in LGBT political activism. New York transsexual activist Judy Bowen organized two other short-lived groups, TAT (Transsexuals and Transvestites) in 1970, and Transsexuals Anonymous in 1971, but neither had lasting influence. Far more significant was Mario Martino's creation of the Labyrinth Foundation Counseling Service in the late 1960s in New York, the first transgender community-based organization that specifically addressed the needs of female-to-male transsexuals. Sylvia Rivera, a transgender veteran of the Stonewall Riots, was an early member of the Gay Liberation Front and Gay Activists Alliance in New York. Along with her sister-in-arms Marsha P. (for "Pay It No Mind") Johnson, Rivera founded STAR (Street Transvestite Action Revolutionaries) in 1970. That same year, New York gay drag activist Lee Brewster and heterosexual transvestite Bunny Eisenhower founded the Queens Liberation Front, and Brewster began publishing Queens, one of the more political transgender publications of the 1970s.

Leading figures of the militant transgender activism on the West Coast were Beth Elliott and Angela Douglas. Elliot was one of the first politically active transsexual lesbians, who at one point served as vice-president of the San Francisco chapter of the Daughters of Bilitis, the lesbian homophile organization, and edited the chapter's newsletter, Sisters. Elliot became a flashpoint for the issue of MTF (male-to-female) transsexual inclusion in the women's community when, after a divisive public debate, she was ejected from the West Coast Women's Conference in 1973. Douglas had been active in GLF-Los Angeles in 1969 and wrote extensively about sexual liberation issues for Southern California's counter-cultural press. In 1970 she founded TAO (Transsexual/Transvestite Action Organization), which published the Moonshadow and Mirage newsletters. Douglas moved TAO to Miami in 1972, where it came to include several Puerto Rican and Cuban members, and soon grew into the first truly international transgender community organization.

Development and challenges
The 1970s were marked by slow, incremental gains as well as demoralizing setbacks from the first flushes of success in the late 1960s. In the early 1970s in Philadelphia, the Radical Queens Collective forged effective political links with gay liberation and lesbian feminist activism. In Southern California, activists such as Jude Patton and Joanna Clark spearheaded competent social, psychological, and medical support services for transgender people.

Feminist ethicist Janice Raymond in her work Transsexual Empire characterized transgender men as traitors to their sex and to the cause of feminism, and transgender women as rapists engaged in an unwanted penetration of women's space. She suggested that transsexuals be "morally mandated out of existence." As a result of such views, transgender activists in the 1970s and 1980s tended to wage their struggles for equality and human rights in isolation rather than in alliance with other progressive political movements.

Transsexual people lived in oppressive surroundings and were considered wild, unfit or even dangerous, because new political and social agendas, which provoked these negative attitudes, were rising. Those were reasons for pessimism and inactivity in transgender community.

Nevertheless, legal status improved across the country, resulting in easier paths for transgender people to change the gender designations on state-issued identification documents and to find professional and affordable health care. In 1975, the city of Minneapolis became the first governmental entity in the United States to pass trans-inclusive civil rights protection legislation.

New questions, subcultures and challenges in 1980s and after
When the AIDS epidemic became visible in 1981, transgender people—especially minorities involved in street prostitution and injection drug subcultures—were among the hardest hit. One of the few bright spots in transgender activism in the 1980s was the emergence of an organized FTM (female-to-male) transgender community, which took shape nearly two decades later than a comparable degree of organization among the male-to-female transgender movement.

In 1986, inspired by FTM pioneers, Lou Sullivan, a crucially important community-based historian of transgenderism, founded the FTM support group that grew into FTM International, the leading advocacy group for female-to-male individuals, and began publishing The FTM Newsletter. Sullivan was also a founding member and board member of the GLBT Historical Society (formerly the Gay and Lesbian Historical Society) in San Francisco. His personal and activist papers are preserved in the institution's archives as collection no. 1991-07; the papers are fully processed and available for use by researchers, and a finding aid is posted on the Online Archive of California. The Historical Society has displayed selected materials from Sullivan's papers in a number of exhibitions, notably "Man-i-fest: FTM Mentoring in San Francisco from 1976 to 2009," which was open through much of 2010 in the second gallery at the society's headquarters at 657 Mission St. in San Francisco, and "Our Vast Queer Past: Celebrating San Francsico's GLBT History," the debut exhibition in the main gallery at the society's GLBT History Museum that opened in January 2011 in San Francisco's Castro District.

In the years since Sullivan's death in 1991, Jamison Green has emerged as the leading FTM activist in the United States. He chairs the board of Gender Education and Advocacy, a non-profit educational organization, and serves on the boards of the Transgender Law and Policy Institute and the World Professional Association for Transgender Health. He is also a board member of the Equality Project and an advisory board member of the National Center for Transgender Equality. He was the leader of FTM International from March 1991 to August 1999 and a member of the Human Rights Campaign Business Council until late 2007, when he resigned over the organisation's stance on transgender inclusion in the Employment Non-Discrimination Act.

In 1980, transgender phenomena were officially classified by the American Psychiatric Association as psychopathology, "gender identity disorder."

 Camp Trans 
Camp Trans was sparked by a 1991 incident in which Nancy Burkholder was ejected from the Michigan Womyn's Music Festival after another woman asked her whether she was trans and she refused to answer The festival maintained a "womyn-born-womyn" policy since its inception, as evidenced by posters from the first festival in 1975 .  Each year afterwards a group of women, both transgender and cisgender, protested the exclusion of trans women from the event. Initially these protests were small and sometimes carried on inside of the camp. A more organized group of trans women and their allies began camping and holding demonstrations outside the gate. After a five-year hiatus, Camp Trans returned in 1999, led by transgender activists Riki Ann Wilchins and Leslie Feinberg, as well as many members of the Boston and Chicago Lesbian Avengers. The events of this year drew attention and controversy, culminating in tensions as a small group of transgender activists were admitted into the festival to exchange dialogue with organizers and to negotiate a short-lived compromise allowing only post-operative trans women on the festival land.

The Transsexual Menace and Transgender Nation
The Transsexual Menace, co-founded by Riki Wilchins and Denise Norris in 1994, the year that Transgender Nation folded, tapped into and provided an outlet for the outrage many transgender people experienced in the brutal murder of Brandon Teena, a transgender youth, and two of his friends in a farmhouse in rural Nebraska on December 31, 1993. The murders, depicted in Kimberly Peirce's Academy Award-winning feature film Boys Don't Cry (2000), called dramatic attention to the serious, on-going problem of anti-transgender violence and hate crimes. The Transexual Menace continues to have periodic resurgences to protest both transgender hate-crimes and the marginalization and/or exclusion of transgender issues by the LGBT community.

Another radical and effective organisation was Transgender Nation which noisily dragged transgender issues to the forefront of San Francisco's queer community, and at the local level successfully integrated transgender concerns with the political agendas of lesbian, gay, and bisexual activists to forge a truly inclusive GLBTQ community. Transgender Nation organized a media-grabbing protest at the 1993 annual meeting of the American Psychiatric Association to call attention to the official pathologization of transgender phenomena.
Transgender Nation paved the way for subsequent similar groups such as Transexual Menace and It's Time America that went on to play a larger role in the national political arena.

GenderPAC

GenderPAC (Gender Public Advocacy Coalition) fulfills a vital need for advocacy, both within the transgender community and outside it, on gender-related issues and is by far the largest national organization in the United States devoted to ending discrimination against gender diversity. Rather than focusing on single-identity-based advocacy, GenderPAC recognizes and promotes understanding of the commonality among all types of oppression, including racism, sexism, classism, and ageism. Organisation was founded by Riki Wilchins.

GenderPAC, which has sponsored an annual lobbying day in Washington, D.C., since the late 1990s, is but the most visible of many transgender political groups to emerge over the last decade. More than 30 cities, and a handful of states, have now passed transgender civil rights legislation. While the transgender movement still faces many significant challenges and obstacles to gaining full equality, the wave of activism that began in the early 1990s has not yet peaked.

In terms of violence prevention, GenderPAC collaborates with a Capitol Hill-based coalition of bipartisan organizations to further public education and media awareness about gender-based violent crimes. It emphasizes to members of Congress the need for passage of the Local Law Enforcement Enhancement Act (that is, the Hate Crimes Act).

Further, as part of its public education efforts, the organization has held an annual National Conference on Gender in Washington, D. C. since 2001. The conference is a gathering of over 1,000 activists throughout the country and from numerous colleges, who work together for three days on issues of gender policy, education, and strategy. Some of the programs are GenderYOUTH, Workplace Fairness, Violence Prevention, and Public Education initiatives through which GenderPAC works to dispel myths about gender stereotypes.

The GenderYOUTH program, for example, strives to empower young activists so that they can create GenderROOTS college campus chapters themselves, and go on to educate others about school violence. Via its Workplace Fairness project, GenderPAC helps to educate elected officials about gender issues, change public attitudes, and support lawsuits that may expand legal rights for people who have suffered discrimination on the basis of gender.

 Community disagreements 
GenderPAC exemplified what certain feminists opposed about queer rights movements and certain elements of gender studies: Sheila Jeffreys wrote that its aims ignored women in favor of "transgenders , most of whom are men, and homosexuality," and that the organization's conception of gender as something that should be protected, and the basis for individuals rights that needed to be respected rather than eliminated, would serve to reinforce discrimination.

Conversely, other transgender rights organizations were angered by GenderPAC's rejection of the label of a transgender organization and to focus on trans issues. These latter criticized GenderPAC's reputed shift of focus away from a trans-inclusive ENDA at the supposed prompting of HRC, their unwillingness to engage with identity categories, and what they saw as a "violation" or exclusion of trans people through the use of their stories to raise money which was not spent primarily on trans issues.

In fact, GenderPAC's Board and constituency remained heavily transgender from its founding until it ceased operations. Wilchins proposed that the focus of a gender rights struggle to be about the issue of gender discrimination, rather than identity of transgender, which might leave out many of those who suffered discrimination. This view brought the organization to crisis when it took on the case of a self-identified "butch lesbian" who sought help after being repeatedly harassed at work and ultimately fired for allegedly looking "too masculine."  Many on the Board said GenderPAC should only help transgender-identified individuals; others, including Wilchins, maintained that it was the issue of gender discrimination, rather than individual identity, that was paramount. It was a divide that GenderPAC struggled to bridge during its entire time in existence, and in many ways came to define the organization.

 The Transgender Law Center (TLC) 

TIC is a San Francisco-based civil rights organization advocating for transgender communities. They are California's first "fully staffed, state-wide transgender legal organization" and were initially a fiscally sponsored project of the National Center for Lesbian Rights. The stated mission of TLC is to connect transgender people and their families to technically sound and culturally competent legal services, increase acceptance and enforcement of laws and policies that support California's transgender communities, and work to change laws and systems that fail to incorporate the needs and experiences of transgender people.

TLC utilizes direct legal services, public policy advocacy, and educational opportunities to advance the rights and safety of diverse transgender communities.

Since launching in 2002, TLC has held over 250 transgender law workshops providing legal information to more than 3,250 community members, attorneys, social service providers, and business owners, as well as collaborated on public policy initiatives designed to improve safety in schools and prisons and safe access to public restrooms for transgender people in San Francisco. TLC successfully helped to revise San Francisco's "Regulations to Prohibit Gender Identity Discrimination" in December 2003, making them more inclusive of people who do not identify as strictly female or male, and pass cutting-edge legislation in the City of Oakland banning gender identity discrimination in housing, employment, public accommodation, and city services.

Anti-transgender hate crimes
The website Remembering Our Dead, compiled by activist Gwen Smith and hosted by the Gender Education Association, honors the memory of the transgender murder victims. The Remembering Our Dead project spawned the Transgender Day of Remembrance (TDoR), an annual event begun in 1999, which is now observed in dozens of cities around the world.

 The intersex movement 

Intersex activism between the late 1990s and mid 2000s led from demonstrating outside a national pediatric conference, in an event now commemorated by Intersex Awareness Day to speaking inside clinical conferences, and the first human rights investigation into medical "normalization", by the Human Rights Commission of the City and County of San Francisco. This was followed by a period of retrenchment of medical authority over intersex bodies.

The Intersex Society of North America (ISNA) was a non-profit advocacy group founded in 1993 by Cheryl Chase to end shame and secrecy; they also advocated deferring most genital surgeries on children. Other notable members included Morgan Holmes, Max Beck, Howard Devore and Alice Dreger. The ISNA stated that intersex is a socially constructed label that reflects actual biological variation. They further stated that intersex anatomy is not always present at birth, and may not manifest until the child hits puberty. ISNA closed in June 2008 after supporting the creation of a new clinical term for intersex conditions, Disorders of Sex Development (DSD) albeit ambivalently, as a means of opening "many more doors" and engaging with clinicians.

New organizations such as Intersex Campaign for Equality and interACT were since established with civil and human rights goals. Advocacy continues, including legal action, with the "M.C." legal case, advanced by Interact Advocates for Intersex Youth with the Southern Poverty Law Centre still before the courts, international advocacy drawing attention to continuing abuses within the U.S. medical system, and work by Intersex Campaign for Equality and others on recognition of intersex people with non-binary identities. Notable and active U.S. advocates include Georgiann Davis, Pidgeon Pagonis, Sean Saifa Wall, Hida Viloria and Anne Tamar-Mattis.

AIDS activism

Militant groups such as ACT UP (AIDS Coalition to Unleash Power) and Queer Nation crafted a media-oriented, direct-action politics that proved congenial to a new generation of transgender activists. The first transgender activist group to embrace the new queerqueer politics was Transgender Nation, founded in 1992 as an offshoot of Queer Nation's San Francisco chapter. Eruption of AIDS crisis urged for another approach. An effective response to the epidemic meant addressing systemic social problems such as poverty and racism that transcended narrow sexual identity politics. Leslie Feinberg's influential pamphlet, Transgender Liberation: A Movement Whose Time Has Come, published in 1992, heralded a new era in transgender politics. Feinberg describes herself as a "white, working class, secular Jewish, transgender lesbian", and personally uses she or ze to describe her/herself. Feinberg's 1993 first novel Stone Butch Blues, won the Lambda Literary Award and the 1994 American Library Association Gay & Lesbian Book Award. The work is not an autobiography.Omnigender: A trans-religious approach Virginia R. Mollenkott, Pilgrim Press, 2001; .
Feinberg has authored two non-fiction books, Trans Liberation: Beyond Pink or Blue and Transgender Warriors: Making History, the novel Drag King Dreams, and Rainbow Solidarity in Defense of Cuba, a compilation of 25 journalistic articles, and has been awarded an honorary doctorate from Starr King School for the Ministry for transgender and social justice work.

 The Human Rights Campaign (HRC) 

It is the largest LGBT civil rights advocacy group and political lobbying organization in the United States. According to the HRC, it has more than 1.5 million members and supporters.

HRC is an umbrella group of two separate non-profit organizations and a political action committee: the HRC Foundation, a 501(c)(3) organization that focuses on research, advocacy and education; the Human Rights Campaign, a 501(c)(4) organization that focuses on promoting the social welfare of lesbian, gay, bisexual, and transgender (LGBT) people through lobbying Congress and state and local officials for support of pro-LGBT bills, and mobilizing grassroots action amongst its members; and the HRC Political Action Committee, which supports candidates that adhere to its positions on LGBT rights.

Local activities are carried out by local steering committees, of which there are over 30 located throughout the United States.

 The Global Equality Fund (GEF) 

It is a program of the Secretary of State's Office of Global Partnerships, launched by U.S. Secretary of State Hillary Clinton in December 2011, that supports programs advocating the human rights of lesbian, gay, bisexual and transgender (LGBT) people around the world through public-private partnerships.

The GEF makes $3 million available to civil society organizations worldwide through small grants and requests for proposal.

The government of Norway has pledged financial support for the GEF.

The GEF has partnered with the mGive Foundation in order to solicit donations via mobile phones, and has fundraised with other organizations such as the Human Rights Campaign and the Elton John AIDS Foundation.

The announcement of the GEF won support from Freedom House and the Human Rights Campaign.

LGBT rights and the Supreme Court
 1956 - Supreme Court rules that a homosexual publication is not automatically obscene and thus protected by the First Amendment.
 1967 - Supreme Court rules that Congress may exclude immigrants on the grounds that they are homosexual. Congress amends its laws in 1990.
 1972 - Supreme Court rules that a Minnesota law defining marriage as a union between a man and a woman is constitutional.
 1976 - Supreme Court refuses to hear and thus affirms a lower courts ruling that a Virginia state sodomy law is constitutional. (see Doe v. Commonwealth's Attorney).
 1985 - Supreme Court is equally divided in a 4-4 decision, and thus affirms an Oklahoma Appeals Court ruling that an Oklahoma law that gave the public school broad authority to fire homosexual teachers was too broad and thus unconstitutional.
 1986 - In Bowers v. Hardwick the Supreme Court rules that sodomy laws are constitutional. The court overturns this ruling in the 2003 case of Lawrence v. Texas.
 1996 - In Romer v. Evans the high court overturns a state constitutional amendment prohibiting elected lawmakers in Colorado from including LGB people in their civil rights laws.
 1998 - The Supreme Court rules that federal sexual harassment laws do include same-sex sexual harassment.
 2001 - The Supreme Court rules that the Boy Scouts of America does not have to follow state anti-discrimination laws when it comes to sexual orientation.
 2003 - Lawrence vs. Texas declares state sodomy laws that were used to prosecute homosexuals for having sex in the privacy of their homes unconstitutional.
 2013 - United States v. Windsor declares Section 3 of the Defense of Marriage Act unconstitutional, rendering same-sex marriages performed in jurisdictions where legal recognized by the federal government.
 2015 - Obergefell v. Hodges, in a 5–4 decision, legalized same-sex marriage nationwide, in all 50 states.
 2020 - Bostock v. Clayton County, in a 6–3 decision, held that Title VII of the Civil Rights Act of 1964 protects employees against discrimination because they are gay or transgender.

LGBT Rights and State Courts
 1961 - Illinois is the first state to abolish its sodomy laws.
 1998 - Maine became the first state to repeal its existing gay-rights statutes
 1999 - Vermont Supreme Court grants the same rights and protections that married heterosexuals have to homosexual partners.
 1999 - Antisodomy laws of 32 states were repealed
 1999 - 11 states had laws to protect homosexuals from discrimination
 2000 - Vermont Supreme Court backed civil unions between homosexual couples
 2003 - Massachusetts Highest Court rules that homosexuals do have the right to marry according to the constitution.
 2003 - Antisodomy Laws in all states were overturned.
 2006 - New Jersey's Supreme Court extends civil rights to homosexuals and allows civil unions
 2008 - California and Connecticut Supreme Courts abolished their states' bans on same-sex marriages
 2009 - Iowa Supreme Court unanimously legalized same-sex marriage in Varnum v. Brien

American political parties, interest groups and LGBT rights
The Libertarian Party supported
a libertarian perspective on LGBT rights from its founding in 1971. Its first platform , in 1972, said, "We hold that no action which does not infringe the rights of others can properly be termed a crime. We favor the repeal of all laws creating "crimes without victims" now incorporated in Federal, state and local laws—such as laws on voluntary sexual relations, drug use, gambling, and attempted suicide." In 1976 the party published a pamphlet, "Gay Rights: A Libertarian Approach," which called for an end to sodomy laws and other legal discrimination, including with regard to marriage and adoption. The pamphlet also explained that libertarians opposed "legislation forcing private persons who, for one reason or another, dislike homosexuals, nevertheless to hire them, admit them to "public accommodations" (which are not really "public" at all, but privately owned), and rent or sell apartment or houses to them" because "freedom...implies also the freedom to be wrong." 2012 Libertarian presidential nominee criticized President Obama for not endorsing a federal right to gay marriage.

The National Stonewall Democratic Federation is the official LGBT organization for the Democratic Party, while the Log Cabin Republicans is the organization for lesbian, gay and bisexual citizens that want to moderate the Republican Party social policies. In terms of minor political parties, the Outright Libertarians is the official LGBT organization for the Libertarian Party, and is among the groups that follow the Libertarian perspectives on gay rights. The Green Party LGBT members are represented by the Lavender Greens. The Socialist Party USA has a Queer Commission to focus on LGBT rights issues.

In terms of interest groups, the Human Rights Campaign is the largest LGBT organization in the United States, claiming over 725,000 members and supporters, though this membership count is disputed.  The HRC endorses federal candidates, and while it is technically bi-partisan and has endorsed some Republican Party, its overall pro-choice, center-left philosophy tends to favor the Democratic Party candidates.  The National Gay and Lesbian Taskforce is a progressive LGBT organization that focuses on local, state and federal issues, while the Independent Gay Forum and the Gays and Lesbians for Individual Liberty both subscribe to conservative or libertarian principles.  And the Empowering Spirits Foundation not only engages in empowering individuals and organizations to engage in the political process for equality, but engages in service-oriented activities in communities typically opposed to equal rights to help bring about change.

American law and LGBT rights

As a federal republic, absent of many federal laws or court decisions, LGBT rights often are dealt with at the local or state level.  Thus the rights of LGBT people in one state may be very different from the rights of LGBT people in another state.
 Same-sex couples: On June 26, 2015, the U.S. Supreme Court struck down all state bans on same-sex marriage, legalized it in all fifty states, and required states to honor out-of-state same-sex marriage''' licenses in the case Obergefell v. Hodges.  See also Same sex marriage in the United States.
 Freedom of Speech - Homosexuality as way of expression and life is not as obscene, and thus protected under the First Amendment.  However, states can reasonably regulate the time, place and manner of speech.  Pornography is protected, when it is not obscene, but it is based on local community standards, which is reasonable and fair.
 Civil rights - Sexual orientation is not a protected class under Federal civil rights law, but it is protected for federal civilian employees and in federal security clearance issues. The United States Supreme Court implied in Romer v. Evans that a state may not prohibit gay people from using the democratic process to get protection, prescribed by antidiscrimination law.
 Education - Public schools and universities generally have to recognize an LGBT student organization, if they recognize other social or political organization, but high school students may be required to get parental consent.
 Hate crimes and criminal law - Area in which, perhaps, the biggest progression is made. Federal hate crime law now includes sexual orientation and gender identity. The Matthew Shepard Act, officially the Matthew Shepard and James Byrd Jr. Hate Crimes Prevention Act, which expands the 1969 United States federal hate-crime law to include crimes motivated by a victim's actual or perceived gender, sexual orientation, gender identity, or disability, is an Act of Congress, passed on October 22, 2009,  and was signed into law by President Barack Obama on October 28, 2009, as a rider to the National Defense Authorization Act for 2010 (H.R. 2647). As far as criminal law is concerned, homosexual relations between consenting adults in private is not a crime, per Lawrence v. Texas.  The age of consent for heterosexuals and homosexuals should be the same, but each state decides what that age shall be.  This does not apply to military law, where sodomy is still a felony under the Uniform Code of Military Justice.   Although, the Lawrence decision has been cited in some military cases as applying.

See also

 Bisexual American history
 Gay Lib v. University of Missouri
 Gay men in American history
 Lesbian American history
 LGBT social movements
 Libertarian perspectives on gay rights
 Socialism and LGBT rights
 Gay Blue Jeans Day
 Society for Human Rights
 Join the Impact
 Timeline of LGBT history
 Transgender American history
 Coming out
 Intersex human rights
 Intersex rights by country

References

Further reading
 Bullough, Vern L. Before Stonewall: Activists for Gay and Lesbian Rights in Historical Context. Harrington Park Press, 2002.
 
 Dynes, Wayne R. (ed.) Encyclopedia of Homosexuality. New York and London, Garland Publishing, 1990
 Johansson, Warren & Percy, William A. Outing: Shattering the Conspiracy of Silence. Harrington Park Press, 1994.
 Shilts, Randy.  The Mayor of Castro Street: The Life and Times of Harvey Milk. New York: St. Martin's Press, 1982.  
 Thompson, Mark, editor.  Long Road to Freedom: The Advocate History of the Gay and Lesbian Movement. New York: St. Martin's Press, 1994.  
 Timmons, Stuart.  The Trouble with Harry Hay: Founder of the Modern Gay Movement.  Boston: Alyson Publications, 1990.

External links
 On Important Pre-Stonewall Activists
 Queer Commission of the Socialist Party USA
 LGBT Political Investment Caucus
 Revolting Queers 2007
 Gay Rights Movement Confronts Teen Suicides, Homophobic Electioneering and Violent Attacks - video report by Democracy Now!Some of this article has been used with permission of Susan Stryker from glbtq.com and has been released under the GFDL.'' 

LGBT rights movement
History of LGBT civil rights in the United States
Political ideologies